The 2015 Campeonato Amapaense de Futebol was the 25th edition of Amapá's top professional football league. The competition began on 4 July and ended on 26 September.

Format
9 teams  play each other once each. The four best teams advance to the semifinals, and the two winners of the semifinals will go to the Final where they will decide the title. The champion qualify to the 2016 Campeonato Brasileiro Série D, 2016 Copa Verde and 2016 Copa do Brasil.

First phase

Semifinals

Finals

References

Amapaense
2015